Saskia Hampele is an Australian actress. She began her acting career in 1997 with an appearance in children's television series The Gift. Hampele worked as a counselor at The Reach Foundation and the Royal Children's Hospital, while pursuing her acting career. She appeared in the 2008 mockumentary Mark Loves Sharon and the two feature films Arctic Blast and Blame in 2010. The following year, Hampele made a guest appearance in City Homicide and began starring in an online series called Shutterbugs. Hampele played Georgia Brooks in Neighbours from 2012 until 2016. She stars in 2019 serial drama The Heights.

Early and personal life
Hampele was born in Perth. While her main focus is acting, she also writes her own songs and plays the guitar and piano. Hampele's mother is a musician and she revealed that she had access to "every instrument under the sun" when she was younger. She stated that she would like to make a solo record in the future. Hampele's hobbies include cooking and travelling. Hampele is married to television presenter Kayne Tremills.

Career
Hampele began her acting career in 1997, while she was in primary school. She appeared in children's television series The Gift as well as other local television productions. Hampele qualified as a social worker and worked as a counsellor at The Reach Foundation and the Royal Children's Hospital cancer ward, while continuing with her acting career. Hampele told Gary Dudak of Mandatory.com "The psychology aspect of my studies has actually been a massive help when it comes to analyzing and exploring new characters, so even though I'm not using my degree directly anymore, it's still really helpful." Hampele's next television role occurred in 2008 when she appeared as Beth in the six-part mockumentary, Mark Loves Sharon.

Hampele appeared in two Australian feature films in 2010. She played Dr Zoe Quinn in Brian Trenchard-Smith's disaster film Arctic Blast. She then appeared as Alice in Blame, which was shown at the Melbourne International Film Festival, the Cannes Film Festival and the Toronto International Film Festival. 2011 saw Hampele appear in a supporting role in crime drama City Homicide. The actress also became involved in an online comedy Shutterbugs. The series, which focuses on a photographer and her best friend trying to get the perfect shot, was showcased at the LAWebFest in Los Angeles. In 2012, Hampele starred in the film 6 Plots as Sophie Halms, which had its world premiere at the Cannes Film Festival.

On 1 August 2012, it was announced Hampele had joined the main cast of Neighbours as Georgia Brooks, the cousin of established character Toadfish Rebecchi (Ryan Moloney). Hampele was in the Kakadu National Park with her boyfriend when her agent called her about the role. She was asked to record an "impromptu" audition tape to send to the Neighbours producers, and did so in the park. Hampele made her first appearance as Georgia in October. In 2013, Hampele recorded and released a song called "Letting You Know", which was featured in the show. She decided to leave Neighbours in early 2015 to pursue new acting roles in Los Angeles. Hampele made a brief return in 2016.

Hampele appears in the 2017 film A Few Less Men. In the same year, she launched Gift Box, an initiative that provides homeless women with sanitary products. A crowd funding campaign raised $45,000 to start up the enterprise. In October 2017, Hampele won the Judges' Choice award at the Women of the Future Awards for Gift Box.

Hampele appears in the 2019 serial drama The Heights.

In 2021 she appeared as Laura in "This Little Love of Mine".

Filmography

References

External links

Living people
21st-century Australian actresses
Australian film actresses
Year of birth missing (living people)
Australian soap opera actresses
Actresses from Perth, Western Australia